The 1964–65 Illinois Fighting Illini men's basketball team represented the University of Illinois.

Regular season
Head coach Harry Combes Fighting Illini basketball team returned to their winning ways for the 1964-65 season. Even though they were not ranked in the pre-season top 20 of college basketball teams, they peaked at #6 during the course of the season in the Associated Press and finished the season ranked #16 in the coaches poll. During the course of the season, the Illini would play in two mid-season tournaments and participate 24 regular season games, the most since 1908 when they played in 26.  The tournaments the Illini would participate in would be the ECAC Quaker City Tournament in Philadelphia and a return trip to the Kentucky Invitational Tournament in Lexington, Kentucky. The highlight of the season would happen in the season opener when the Illini would defeat the previous season's national champion UCLA Bruins by a score of 110-83. The 1965 Bruins would finish with a 28-2 record and their second national championship.

The 1964-65 team utilized several returning lettermen including the leading scorer, team "MVP" and captain, Skip Thoren. It also saw the return of team seniors Tal Brody, Bogie Redmon, Bill McKeown as well as Juniors Don Freeman, Jim Vopicka and Larry Hinton to their lineup. It also included sophomores Jim Dawson, Bob Johansen and future Dallas Cowboy, Preston Pearson. The Illini finished the season with a conference record of 10 wins and 4 losses, finishing in 3rd place in the Big Ten. They would finish with an overall record of 18 wins and 6 losses.  The starting lineup included Skip Thoren at the center position, Tal Brody and Jim Dawson at guard and Don Freeman and Bogie Redmon at the forward slots.

Roster

Source

Schedule
												
Source																
												

|-
!colspan=12 style="background:#DF4E38; color:white;"| Non-Conference regular season											

|-
!colspan=9 style="background:#DF4E38; color:#FFFFFF;"|Big Ten regular season

|-

Player stats

Awards and honors
Bogie Redmon
Converse Honorable Mention All-American
Tal Brody
Helms 1st Team All-American
Converse 2nd Team All-American
Sporting News 2nd Team All-American
Duane "Skip" Thoren
Helms 1st Team All-American
Converse 2nd Team All-American
Associated Press 2nd Team All-American
United Press 3rd Team All-American
Basketball News 3rd Team All-American
National Association of Basketball Coaches 3rd Team All-American
Team Most Valuable Player

Team players drafted into the NBA

Rankings

References

Illinois Fighting Illini
Illinois Fighting Illini men's basketball seasons
Illinois Fighting Illini men's basketball
Illinois Fighting Illini men's basketball